Cecilia Damström, (born 28 July 1988) is a Finnish award-winning composer. She is known for expressing strong political opinions through her works for orchestra and choir.

Career
Born in Helsinki, Damström studied composition at Tampere University of Applied Sciences (2008–2014) and at Malmö Academy of Music (2014–2015 and 2017–2018) under the instruction of Hannu Pohjannoro and Luca Francesconi.

Damström's music has been performed by the Finnish National Opera and Ballet, Finnish Radio Symphony Orchestra and the Brodsky Quartet, among others

Damström has won the first prize at the International Vocal Espoo Choral Composition Competition, the International Linköpings Studentsångare Composition Award and the International Josef Dorfman Composition Competition.

List of works

Orchestra 

 Wasteland (2022), symphony orchestra, 20 min
 ICE (2021), symphony orchestra, 10 min 
 Fretus (2021), string orchestra, 10 min
 Nixus (2020), symphony orchestra, 10 min
 Lucrum (2018), symphony orchestra, 7 min
 Tundo! (2016/2018), symphony orchestra, 10 min
 Infirmus (2015), string orchestra, 7 min
 Unborn (2012–2014), symphony orchestra, 10 min
 Paradiso (2015), wind orchestra, 4 min

Opera 

 Vickan & Väinö (2019), fairytale opera, 35 min
 Djurens planet (2018), school opera, 40 min
 Dumma kungen (2016), fairytale opera, 65 min

Chamber music 
 Vibrations (2021), recorder flute, violin and organ, 17 min
 Cura (2020), violin and piano, 7 min
 Helene (2020), piano and wind quartet, 20 min
 Nisus (2019), string trio, 7 min
 Aino (2018), Pierrot ensemble, 23 min
 Letters (2018), string quartet, 15 min
 Minna (2017), piano quintet, 24 min
 Celestial Beings (2018), violin and viola, 13 min
 Groove (2015), flute and accordion, 7 min
 Via Crucis (2012–2014), string quartet, 20 min

Solo works 
 Renewables (2022), accordion, 14 min
 Epitaph (2018), piano, 5 min
 Shapes (2016), accordion, 16 min
 Characters (2015) 11 miniatures for piano, 6 min
 Sydänlaulu (2014), violin, 6 min
 Under Stjärnhimmelen (2014) for piano/organ/guitar, 2:30 min
 Psychedelic (2012), piano, 11 min
 Loco (2010), altviolin, 5min
 Piano Delirium (2009), piano, 3min

Vocal music 

 Framtidens skugga (2019–2020), mezzo soprano and piano, 18 min
 Öar i ett hav som strömmar (2018), soprano and piano, 15 min
 Tidens ordning (2017), bass baritone and piano, 8 min
 Ordet (2015–2016) for female and male voice, cla, 2 vln, vla, vlc, cb, 13 min
 Dagbok (2011) for soprano and orchestra or piano, 10 min
 Landet som icke är (2009), sop, bar, 2 vln, vla, vlc, cb, tr, perc, 7 min

Choral music 

 Hav (2020), male choir, 15 min
 Requiem for our Earth (2019), female choir with electronics and video projection, 30 min
 Angor (2015), mixed choir, 6 min
 At Teasdale’s (2016), male choir, 5 min
 Credo (2012), mixed choir, 7min
 El jardín de las morenas (2014), children choir, 7min
 Han som du älskar finns inte mer (2009), mixed choir, 7min
 Min Gud (2010), mixed choir or female choir, 11 min

Awards 

 Teosto Prize, Finland, 2022
 Free State of Bavaria: International Artist-in-Residence-Programme Villa Concordia in Bamberg 2021-2022 
 Children opera of the year 2018
 Rosenborg-Gehrmans Award for the young composer of the year 2018
 International Vocal Espoo Choral Composition Competition 2016
 International Linköpings Studentsångare Composition Award 2016
 International Josef Dorfman Composition Competition 2015

References 

Finnish classical composers
Finnish women classical composers
1988 births
Living people
Musicians from Helsinki